"Hungry Heart" is a song by Bruce Springsteen from his album The River.

Hungry Heart or Hungry Hearts may also refer to:

Film and television
 A Hungry Heart, 1917 silent film drama directed by Emile Chautard
 The Hungry Heart, 1917 silent drama directed by Robert G. Vignola
 Hungry Heart, 1987 romance directed by Luigi Acquisto
 "Hungry Heart", 2001 episode of the T.V. show Frasier
 Hungry Hearts (1916 film), 1916 silent comedy featuring Oliver Hardy
 Hungry Hearts (1922 film), 1922 film directed by E. Mason Hopper based on the novel
 Hungry Hearts (2014 film), 2014 drama directed by Saverio Costanzo

Other uses
 Hungry Heart: Wild Striker, Japanese soccer manga and anime series
 "Hungry Hearts" (Nause song), 2012 single by Nause
 Hungry Hearts (short story collection), 1920 collection of short stories by Anzia Yezierska
 Hungry Hearts (The Searchers album), 1988